The year 1702 in music involved some significant events.

Events 
13 March – A month after commencing his university education, 17-year-old George Frideric Handel accepts the position of organist at Halle Cathedral, replacing J. C. Leporin, for whom he had acted as assistant.
Johann Sebastian Bach concludes his musical education at St. Michael's School in Lüneburg.
Georg Philipp Telemann becomes director of Leipzig opera, and founds Leipzig Collegium Musicum.
Alessandro Scarlatti leaves Naples and seeks the patronage of Prince Ferdinando de' Medici.
Michel de Saint-Lambert publishes Les principes du clavecin.
Probable year – German Baroque composer Jakob Greber moves from Italy to London – accompanied by his mistress, operatic soprano Margherita de L'Épine – where he will remain for three years composing incidental music for plays and arias for L'Épine, including those for this year's première of Nicholas Rowe's play The Fair Penitent.

Published popular music 
Tavern Bilkers, burlesque by John Weaver

Classical music 
Giovanni Henrico Albicastro – Sonate a violino solo col basso continuo
Tomaso Albinoni  
Lontananza crudel, mi squarci il core, T.204.04 (Op. 4)
Poiché al vago seren di due pupille, T.205
Friedrich Nicolaus Brauns – St John Passion (formerly attributed to Reinhard Keiser)
Marc-Antoine Charpentier 
Extremum Dei judicium, H.401
Judicium Salomonis, performed for the opening of the French parliament
François Couperin  
Quatre versets d'un motet composé et chanté par ordre du roy
Qui dat nivem sicut lanam
Johann Caspar Ferdinand Fischer  
Ariadne musica
Tafelmusik
Louis Marchand – Pièces de clavecin, Livre 1
James Paisible
6 Sonatas of Two Parts
Airs for the play King Edward the Third
Airs for the comedy She Would and She Would Not
Alessandro Scarlatti – Mottetti sacri ad una, due, trè, e quattro voci con violini
Francesco Scarlatti – Dixit dominus (Psalm 110)
Johannes Schenck – Le nymphe di Rheno, 12 sonatas and suites for 2 violas da gamba, Op. 8 (Amsterdam)
Johann Speth – Ars Magna Consoni et Dissoni
Francisco Valls – Missa Scala Aretina
Friedrich Wilhelm Zachow – Danksaget dem Vater

Opera 
François Bouvard – Médus
André Campra – Tancrède
Pietro Torri – Torneo

Births 
January 6 – José de Nebra, composer (died 1768)
February 7 – Carl August Thielo, composer (died 1763)
February 27 – Johann Valentin Görner, composer (died 1762)
March 5 – Michael Mietke II, German harpsichord maker (died 1754)
March 13 – Burkat Shudi, Swiss-born harpsichord maker (died 1773)
March 27 – Johann Ernst Eberlin, composer (died 1762)
July 22 – Alessandro Besozzi, oboist and composer (died 1793)
date unknown – Antoine Gilis, composer (died 1781)

Deaths 
July 6 – Nicolas Lebègue, French harpsichordist, composer and organist (born 1632)
July 16 – Étienne Loulié, musician, pedagogue and musical theorist (born 1654)
September 17 – Olaus Rudbeck, composer (born 1630)
December – José de Cascante, organist and composer (born 1646)

References

 
18th century in music
Music by year